Roger L. Cloutier Jr. (born March 15, 1965) is a retired United States Army lieutenant general who last served as the Commander of Allied Land Command. Previously, he served as the Commander of the United States Army Africa and the Southern European Task Force. Cloutier graduated from the University of San Diego in 1988 with a bachelor's degree in political science and a masters in international relations.

Rumors of capture
In April 2022, rumors began circulating that Cloutier had been captured by Russian forces in Mariupol whilst training the Azov Battalion. PolitiFact rated this information as false, also Reuters. Following the rumors Cloutier made an online post via his LinkedIn profile.

Military Awards 

 Defense Distinguished Medal
 Defense Superior Service Medal with Oak Leaf Cluster
 Legion of Merit with Oak Leaf Cluster
 Bronze Star Medal with two Oak Leaf Clusters
 Defence Meritorious Service Medal
 Meritorious Service Medal with three Oak Leaf Clusters
 Army Commendation Medal with "V" Device
 Army Commendation Medal with three Oak Leaf Clusters
 Army Achievement Medal with five Oak Leaf Clusters

References

External links
 

Living people
1965 births
Military personnel from Maine
Recipients of the Defense Distinguished Service Medal
Recipients of the Defense Superior Service Medal
Recipients of the Distinguished Service Medal (US Army)
Recipients of the Legion of Merit
United States Army generals
United States Army personnel of the Iraq War